Clement Clarke Moore (July 15, 1779 – July 10, 1863) was an American writer, scholar and real estate developer. He is best known as author of the Christmas poem "A Visit from St. Nicholas."

Moore was Professor of Oriental and Greek Literature, as well as Divinity and Biblical Learning, at the General Theological Seminary of the Protestant Episcopal Church, in New York City. The seminary was developed on land donated by Moore and it continues on this site at Ninth Avenue between 20th and 21st streets, in an area known as Chelsea Square. Moore gained considerable wealth by subdividing and developing other parts of his large inherited estate in what became known as the residential neighborhood of Chelsea. He also served for 44 years as a member of the board of trustees of Columbia College (later University), and was a board member of the New York Society Library and the New York Institution for the Blind.

"A Visit from St. Nicholas," which later became widely known by its opening line, "'Twas the Night Before Christmas," was first published anonymously in 1823. Moore publicly claimed authorship in 1844, and this was not disputed during his lifetime, but a rival claimant emerged later and scholars now debate the identity of the author, calling on textual and handwriting analysis as well as other historical sources.

Early life
Moore was born on July 15, 1779, in New York City at Chelsea, at his mother's family estate. He was the son of Benjamin Moore (1748–1816) and Charity (née Clarke) Moore (1747–1838). At the time of Clement's birth Benjamin Moore was assistant rector of Trinity Church in Manhattan. He later became rector of Trinity and bishop of the Episcopal Diocese of New York, also serving as acting president of Kings College in 1775 and 1776 and president of the renamed Columbia College (now Columbia University) from 1801 to 1811.

Moore's maternal grandfather was Major Thomas Clarke, an English officer who stayed in the colony after fighting in the French and Indian War.  He owned the large Manhattan estate "Chelsea", then in the country north of the developed areas of the city.  As a girl, Moore's mother Charity Clarke wrote letters to her English cousins. Preserved at Columbia University, these show her disdain for the policies of the British monarchy and her growing sense of patriotism in pre-Revolutionary days. Moore's grandmother Sarah Fish was a descendant of Elizabeth Fones and Joris Woolsey, one of the earlier settlers of Manhattan.  Moore's parents inherited the Chelsea estate, and deeded it to him in 1813. He earned great wealth by subdividing and developing it in the 19th century.

Moore received a Bachelor of Arts from Columbia College as valedictorian of the class of 1798, and earned his Master's degree there in 1801.

Career
One of Moore's earliest known works was an anonymous pro-Federalist pamphlet published prior to the 1804 presidential election, attacking the religious and racial views of Thomas Jefferson (the incumbent president and Democratic-Republican candidate). His polemic, titled in full "Observations upon Certain Passages in Mr. Jefferson's Notes on Virginia, which Appear to Have a Tendency to Subvert Religion, and Establish a False Philosophy," depicted Jefferson's Notes on the State of Virginia (1785) as an "instrument of infidelity" that "debases the negro to an order of creatures lower than those who have a fairer skin and thinner lips."

In 1820, Moore helped Trinity Church organize a new parish church, St. Luke in the Fields, on Hudson Street. He later gave 66 tracts of land – the apple orchard from his inherited Chelsea estate – to the Episcopal Diocese of New York to be the site of the General Theological Seminary.

Based likely on this donation, and on the publication of his Hebrew and English Lexicon in 1809, Moore was appointed as professor of Biblical learning at the Seminary. He held this post until 1850.

After the seminary was built, Moore began the residential development of his Chelsea estate in the 1820s with the help of James N. Wells, dividing it into lots along Ninth Avenue and selling them to well-heeled New Yorkers. Covenants in the deeds of sale created a planned neighborhood, specifying what could be built on the land as well as architectural details of the buildings. Stables, manufacturing and commercial uses were forbidden in the development.

From 1840 to 1850, Moore also served as a board member of the New York Institution for the Blind at 34th Street and Ninth Avenue (now the New York Institute for Special Education). He published a collection of poems (1844).

A Visit from St. Nicholas

This poem, "arguably the best-known verses ever written by an American," was first published anonymously in the Troy, New York Sentinel on December 23, 1823. It was sent to the paper by a friend of Moore. Moore was said to have written the poem while visiting his cousin, Mary McVicker, at Constable Hall, in what is now known as Constableville, New York.  In 1855, Mary C. Moore Ogden, one of the Moores' married daughters, painted "illuminations" to go with the first color edition of the poem.

It was not until 1837, in The New-York Book of Poetry (edited by Charles Fenno Hoffman), that the poem was first attributed in print to Moore. Initially, Moore refused to deny or confirm authorship of the poem, so as to protect his public reputation as a professor of ancient languages. In 1844, he included it in "Poems", an anthology of his works.  His children, for whom he had originally written the piece, encouraged this publication. The original publisher and at least seven others had already acknowledged him as author prior to this release.

Authorship controversy
Scholars have debated whether Moore was the author of this poem. Professor Donald Foster used textual content analysis and external evidence to argue that Moore could not have been the author. Foster believes that Major Henry Livingston, Jr., a New Yorker with Dutch and Scottish roots, should be considered the chief candidate for authorship. This view was long espoused by the Livingston family. Livingston was distantly related to Moore's wife.

In response to Foster's claim, Stephen Nissenbaum, professor of history at the University of Massachusetts, wrote in 2001 that, based on his research, Moore was the author. In his article, "There Arose Such a Clatter
Who Really Wrote 'The Night before Christmas'? (And Why Does It Matter?)", Nissenbaum confirmed Moore's authorship, "I believe he did, and I think I have marshaled an array of good evidence to prove [it]".

Foster's claim has also been countered by document dealer and historian Seth Kaller, who once owned one of Moore's original manuscripts of the poem. Kaller has offered a point-by-point rebuttal of both Foster's linguistic analysis and external findings, buttressed by the work of autograph expert James Lowe and Dr. Joe Nickell, author of Pen, Ink and Evidence.

There is no proof that Livingston ever claimed authorship, nor has any record ever been found of any printing of the poem with Livingston's name attached to it. But, according to the original copy of the poem that was sent to The Sentinel, the names of Santa's last two reindeer were Dunder and Blixem, instead of Donder (later Donner) and Blitzen, as printed. The changes in spelling are attributed to a printing error and/or correcting Moore's spelling inaccuracies, as he did not speak Dutch.

In 2016, the matter was discussed by MacDonald P. Jackson, an emeritus professor of English literature at the University of Auckland, a fellow of the Royal Society of New Zealand and an expert in authorship attribution using statistical techniques. He evaluated every argument using modern computational stylistics, including one never used before – statistical analysis of phonemes – and found, in his opinion, that in every test that Livingston was the more likely author.

Developing Chelsea

Moore's estate, named Chelsea, was on the west side of the island of Manhattan north of Greenwich Village. It was mostly open countryside before the 1820s. It had been purchased in 1750 by his maternal grandfather Maj. Thomas Clarke, a retired British veteran of the French and Indian War (the North American front of the Seven Years' War). Clarke named his house for the Royal Hospital Chelsea in London that served war veterans. Moore's parents inherited the estate in 1802, and several years later they deeded it to him.

When the government of New York City decided on a street grid in Manhattan, based on the Commissioner's Plan of 1811, the new Ninth Avenue was projected to go through the middle of the Chelsea estate. In 1818, Moore wrote and published a pamphlet calling on other "Proprietors of Real Estate" to oppose the manner in which the city was being developed. He thought it was a conspiracy designed to increase political patronage and appease the city's working class, and argued that making landowners bear the costs of the streets laid through their property was "a tyranny no monarch in Europe would dare to exercise." He also criticized the grid plan and the flattening of hills as ill-advised.

Despite his protests, Moore was already preparing to develop Chelsea, acquiring adjacent plots of land from relatives and neighbors until he owned everything from Eighth Avenue to the Hudson River between 19th and 24th Streets. Together with carpenter-builder James N. Wells he divided the neighborhood into lots and marketed them to well-heeled New Yorkers. He donated a large block of land to the Episcopal diocese for construction of a seminary, giving them an apple orchard consisting of 66 tracts. Construction began in 1827 for the General Theological Seminary. Based on his knowledge of Hebrew, Moore was appointed as its first professor of Oriental Languages, serving until 1850.

The seminary continues to operate on the same site, taking up most of the block between 20th and 21st streets and Ninth and Tenth avenues. Ten years later, Moore gave land at 20th Street and Ninth, east of the avenue, to the diocese for construction of St. Peter's Episcopal Church. The contemporary Manhattan neighborhood is known as Chelsea after his estate.

Moore and slavery 
When Moore's maternal grandmother died in 1802 she left four slaves to Moore's parents. In his 1956 biography of Moore, Samuel W. Patterson asserted that the four remained with the Moore family and were not freed until the full abolition of slavery in New York in 1827, and this assertion has been repeated in many other works. It appears to be incorrect. Manumission records show that Benjamin and Charity Moore freed one of the four, Charles Smith, in 1803. In the 1810 U.S. Census Benjamin Moore is listed as having two slaves in his household, who according to manumission records were subsequently freed in 1811 and 1813 and did not have the same names as the inherited slaves. In the 1820 Census, Clement Moore's first as a head of household, he is listed as having no slaves.

Personal life
In 1813, Moore married Catherine Elizabeth Taylor, daughter of William Taylor and Elizabeth (née Van Cortlandt) Taylor. William Taylor was a New Jersey lawyer who had served as chief justice of Jamaica. Elizabeth Van Cortlandt was a direct descendant of Stephanus Van Cortlandt, the first native-born mayor of New York City and first patroon of Van Cortlandt Manor, as well as the niece by marriage of Sir Edward Buller, 1st Baronet. Together, Catherine and Clement Moore were the parents of nine children:
 Margaret Elliot Moore (1815–1845), who married John Doughty Ogden (1804–1887), a grandson of U.S. Attorney Abraham Ogden and nephew of U.S. Representative David A. Ogden.
 Charity Elizabeth Moore (1816–1830), who died young.
 Benjamin Moore (1818–1886), who married Mary Elizabeth Sing (1820–1895), in 1842, and was the father of Clement Clarke Moore and grandfather of Barrington Moore Sr.
 Mary Clarke Moore (1819–1893), who married John Doughty Ogden, her older sister's widower, in 1848.
 Clement Moore (1821–1889), who did not marry.
 Emily Moore (1822–1828), who also died young.
 William Taylor Moore (1823-1897), who married Lucretia Post in 1857 and, after her death in 1872, Katherine E. Robinson. He had no children.
 Catharine Van Cortlandt Moore (1825–1890), who did not marry.
 Maria Theresa ("Terry") Barrington Moore (1826–1900), who did not marry.

After spending a month in their company in the resort town of Sharon Springs, New York, in 1848, the acerbic diarist George Templeton Strong described the unmarried Moore children as, "the sons a compound of imbecility deep beyond all fathoming, with an appetite for chambermaids beyond all precedent—the two Miss M’s very nice indeed." In the 1850s, Moore began summering in Newport, Rhode Island, together with his daughters Terry and Mary, and Mary's family. He died on July 10, 1863, at his summer residence on Catherine Street in Newport, five days before his 84th birthday. His funeral was held in Trinity Church, Newport, where he had owned a pew. His body was returned to New York for burial in the cemetery at St. Luke in the Fields. On November 29, 1899, his body was reinterred in Trinity Church Cemetery in New York.

Legacy and honors

 In 1911, the Church of the Intercession in Manhattan started a service on the Sunday before Christmas that included a reading of the poem followed by a procession to Moore's tomb at Trinity Church Cemetery on the Sunday before Christmas. This continues until this day.
 Clement Clarke Moore Park, located at 10th Avenue and 22nd Street in Chelsea, is named after Moore.
 A playground opened in the park November 22, 1968, and was named for Moore by local law the following year. In 1995 it was fully renovated, and new trees were added. Local residents gather annually there on the last Sunday of Advent for a reading of "Twas the Night Before Christmas".
 PS13 in Elmhurst, Queens is named after Clement C. Moore.

See also 
 Santa Claus's reindeer

References

Notes

Bibliography

General
 Burrows, Edwin G. & Mike Wallace (1999). Gotham: A History of New York City to 1898.  New York: Oxford University Press. 
 
 James W. Moore (1903), Rev. John Moore of Newtown, Long Island and some of his Descendants. Easton, PA: Chemical Publishing Company, p. 107.
 
 

A Visit from St. Nicholas
 Stedman, Edmund Clarence, An American Anthology (Boston, 1900)
 Observations upon Certain Passages in Mr. [Thomas] Jefferson's Notes on Virginia which Appear to have a Tendency to Subvert Religion, and Establish A False Philosophy (New York, 1804).
 "The Night Before Christmas", New York Sentinel on December 23. The original publisher hinted at Moore's authorship in 1829. Moore was first credited as author by Charles Fenno Hoffman, ed., The New-York Book of Poetry (New York: George Dearborn, 1837)
 Nickell, Joe. "The Case of the Christmas Poem." Manuscripts, Fall 2002, 54;4:293–308, and Manuscripts, Winter 2003, 55;1:5–15
 Nissenbaum, Stephen. The Battle for Christmas: A Cultural History of America's Most Cherished Holiday (New York: Vintage, 1996)
 Kaller, Seth T. "The Moore Things Change…," The New-York Journal of American History, Fall 2004

External links

 "The Authorship of The Night Before Christmas" by Seth Kaller
 A Visit from Saint Nicholas on Poets.org
 Peter Christoph, "Clement Moore revisited", 1982
 The Night Before Christmas Bibliography by Nancy H. Marshall
 Biography of Moore at University of Toronto's Representative Poetry Online.
 Urban Legends – Clement Clarke Moore: The Reluctant Mythmaker
 
 
 
 

1779 births
1863 deaths
18th-century American people
19th-century American poets
American biblical scholars
Columbia College (New York) alumni
American Episcopalians
New York (state) Federalists
People from Elmhurst, Queens
Anglican biblical scholars
Cornell family
American people of English descent
Poets from New York (state)
Winthrop family
Woolsey family
General Theological Seminary faculty
People from Chelsea, Manhattan
Burials at Trinity Church Cemetery